Madera County Connection (MCC) is the primary bus agency providing intercity services within Madera County, California. It is operated by the County Department of Public Works and offers four fixed routes connecting the cities of Chowchilla and Madera with Valley Children's Hospital and smaller unincorporated communities in the county. All four routes meet at the same intermodal terminal in downtown Madera, where riders may transfer to Madera Metro intracity buses or Greyhound Lines intercity buses. Passengers may take Madera Metro to the train station and transfer to the Amtrak San Joaquins intercity service connecting the San Francisco Bay Area and Los Angeles.

Madera County also is responsible for operating dial-a-ride point-to-point services in the unincorporated areas surrounding Madera and Chowchilla (MCC Madera and Chowchilla Dial-A-Ride, respectively), a demand-responsive bus for seniors in the rural eastern part of the county (Eastern Madera County Senior Bus), and a medical escort program (Eastern Madera County Medical Escort Service).

History

Madera County Connection started in 2001 as a demonstration service, providing transportation for children and their families to and from Children's Hospital Central California.

Madera County let a five-year contract to the Fresno Economic Opportunities Commission (EOC) in 2019 to operate county bus services, including MCC. Prior to that, separate contracts were held by Merced Transportation Company for MCC and the Community Action Partnership of Madera County for the Senior Bus and Escort Program.

Services
MCC operates its fixed routes on weekdays, with no service provided on specific holidays (New Year's Day, Memorial Day, July 4, Laabor Day, Thanksgiving, and Christmas).

Fixed routes
All fixed routes originate and terminate at the Madera Intermodal Center in downtown Madera, at the intersection of E Yosemite Avenue and N E Street.

Fares
One-way fares are $2 per passenger; children under 5 ride free with a paid adult fare.

Transfers
Riders may transfer to Fresno Area Express at Valley Children's Hospital for free, or to Madera Metro or Greyhound Lines at the Madera Intermodal Center. In addition, riders on the Eastern County route may transfer to Yosemite Area Regional Transportation System, which offers seasonal service to Yosemite National Park at stops along California State Route 41 in Coarsegold and Oakhurst.

Fleet & facilities
Madera County has thirteen vehicles used for its transit services, of which nine are used by MCC; all nine are lift-equipped Starcraft Allstar 25 van cutaway buses with seating capacity of 15 passengers + 2 wheelchair users.

Before 2019, the administrative office for MCC was at 1200 Maple Street; Madera County renovated an office space at the County Road Yard in Madera at 201 W. Almond Avenue and the contracted operator moved operations and maintenance activities to that location.

References

External links

Official website

Public transportation in the San Joaquin Valley Area
Bus transportation in California
Public transportation in Madera County, California
Transit agencies in California